Nanhai Experimental High School, the Affiliated High School of South China Normal University (French: Lycée Expérimental de Nanhai, École secondaire affiliée à l'Université Normale de la Chine du Sud) is a campus in Nanhai District of the Affiliated High School of South China Normal University. It is a Chinese public School located in the Nanhai District of Foshan City, Guangdong Province, China. There is some evidence that there has been a school founded by Andrew Patton Happer on the site since 1888, but the Affiliated High School of South China Normal University of today was officially founded by the Chinese government in 1952.

Democratic organisations 
Students' Union 
Students' Congress
Dormitories Self-Management Committee for Students
Teachers' Congress

References

Schools in China
High schools in Guangdong